OGLE-2005-BLG-390Lb (known sometimes as Hoth by NASA) is a super-Earth exoplanet orbiting OGLE-2005-BLG-390L, a star  from Earth near the center of the Milky Way, making it  one of the most distant planets known. On January 25, 2006, Probing Lensing Anomalies NETwork/Robotic Telescope Network (PLANET/Robonet), Optical Gravitational Lensing Experiment (OGLE), and Microlensing Observations in Astrophysics (MOA) made a joint announcement of the discovery. The planet does not appear to meet conditions presumed necessary to support life.

Characteristics

Mass, radius and temperature
The planet is estimated to be about five times Earth's mass (5.5 ). Some astronomers have speculated that it may have a rocky core like Earth, with a thin atmosphere. If it is a rocky world, this temperature would make it likely that the surface would be made of frozen volatiles, substances which would be liquids or gases on Earth: water, ammonia, methane and nitrogen would all be frozen solid. If it is not a rocky planet, it would more closely resemble an icy gas planet like Uranus, although much smaller.

The planet is notable for its large distance from its star for such a relatively small exoplanet - these planets are challenging to find with other detection methods. Prior to this, "small" exoplanets such as Gliese 876 d, which has an orbital period of less than 2 Earth-days, were detected very close to their stars. OGLE-2005-BLG-390Lb shows a combination of size and orbit that would not make it out of place in the Solar System.

"The team has discovered the most Earthlike planet yet", said Michael Turner, assistant director for the mathematical and physical sciences directorate at the National Science Foundation, which supported the work. At the time of discovery, with 5.5 Earth masses, the planet was less massive than the previous candidate for lowest-mass exoplanet around a main-sequence star, the 7.5 Earth mass Gliese 876 d. Since 2013, many Earth-sized or smaller planets around main-sequence stars have been detected by the Kepler spacecraft and others.

Host star
OGLE-2005-BLG-390L (located in the constellation Scorpius, RA 17:54:19.2, Dec −30°22′38″, J2000,  6.6 ± 1.0 kpc distance) is thought to likely be a cool red dwarf (95% probability), or a white dwarf (4% probability), with a very slight chance that it is a neutron star or black hole (<1% probability). Regardless of the star's classification, its radiant energy output would be significantly less than that of the Sun. It has a mass of 0.22 , but an unknown radius. If it is a red dwarf, it would likely have a radius of 0.17 . The age is estimated to be around 9.587 billion years old.

Orbit
The planet takes approximately 10 Earth years to orbit its star, OGLE-2005-BLG-390L.

Discovery

OGLE-2005-BLG-390Lb's signature was first detected on January 25, 2006, by observations at the Danish 1.54-m telescope at ESO La Silla Observatory in Chile. The telescope was part of a network of telescopes used by the PLANET/RoboNet gravitational microlensing campaign. Much of the follow-up observational data was gathered by a 0.6-m telescope at the Perth Observatory in Western Australia.

Gravitational lensing occurs when light from a distant star is bent and magnified by the gravitational field of a foreground star. A gravitational microlensing event occurs when a planet accompanying this foreground star can cause an additional small increase in the intensity of magnified light as it passes between the background star and the observer as well.

The PLANET/RoboNet campaign regularly investigates promising microlensing event alerts that are issued by the Polish OGLE or the Japanese–New Zealand MOA survey. The observation of just such an event led to the discovery of OGLE-2005-BLG-390Lb. OGLE detected the microlensing effect produced by the star OGLE-2005-BLG-390L, and it was the PLANET team's follow-up observations and analysis which uncovered evidence of the planet itself.

The PLANET team conducted close observation of the OGLE-2005-BLG-390 microlensing event over a period of about two weeks. During this series of observations, a 15% "spike" in intensity occurred, lasting approximately 12 hours. From the intensity of the increase, and its length, the PLANET astronomers were able to derive the planet's mass, and its approximate displacement from the star.

The paper submitted to Nature bears the names of all members of PLANET, RoboNet, OGLE, and MOA.

In popular culture 
The planet has been given the unofficial name of Hoth by NASA due to its resemblance to the planet with the same name from the Star Wars franchise. A similar exoplanet, OGLE-2016-BLG-1195Lb, has also been compared to Hoth.

See also 

 Gliese 581 c
 Gliese 581 g
 OGLE-2005-BLG-169Lb
 OGLE-2016-BLG-1195Lb
 Optical Gravitational Lensing Experiment (OGLE)
 Planetary habitability

References

External links

Informative 
MOA collaboration
OGLE collaboration
 Planet Homepage

News

Videos 
 

Super-Earths
Scorpius (constellation)
Terrestrial planets
Exoplanets discovered in 2005
Exoplanets detected by microlensing